Ronald Savage (born 1965) is an American entrepreneur, hip hop artist, author, and activist. He was known as the "crate boy" for Jazzy Jay, who was the DJ for Afrika Bambaataa. In 2016, he publicly accused Bambaataa of sexually molesting him. Ron " Bee-Stinger" Savage also is the service mark owner of the registered brand Hip Hop Movement.

Early life 

Growing up in the Castle Hill Houses in The Bronx, Savage became a member of the Universal Zulu Nation at the age of 14. Savage used to spend time with D.J Jazzy Jay while he recorded records in the early 1980s. Savage states, "The best time I had in hip hop, when I was a kid was being paid after the parties, we were being paid (by Bambaataa) in White Castles Hamburgers".

Music career 

Savage got his start in the music industry in 1986 when Jazzy Jay built his recording studio in the Bronx on Blondell Ave. He paid his dues by running errands for Jazzy. In 1986, Jazzy Jay teamed up with Rocky Bucano to start Strong City Records. Soon, Jazzy moved the label to Allerton Ave in the Bronx, where Savage convinced the DJ's to play records of Strong City artists on rap radio and in rap clubs. Soon after in 1988 Strong City Records was acquired by MCA Records to become Strong City / MCA / Uni Records. There, Savage worked on Strong City Record acts such as Busy Bee Starski, Def Duo, Ultimate Force, Ice Cream Tee, Nu Sounds, BZ2 M.C.'s, and other groups like Brand Nubian, Showbiz & A.G, Fat Joe, which all worked out of Jazzy Jay Studios.

A few years later, he left Strong City Records and began working for Dick Scott Entertainment, the management company for the New Kids on The Block, Marky Mark, Boyz II Men. At Dick Scott Entertainment, Savage worked as an artist liaison for the rap group Snap!, whose single "I Got The Power" went No. 1 on the weekly charts in Spain, UK, Netherlands, Switzerland, as well as the Eurochart Hot 100. In 1990 the song hit No. 2 on the US Billboard Hot 100 chart. Savage also handled for Dick Scott Entertainment other groups as Doug E Fresh, Ikey Cee, and Show Biz & A.G.

In 1990, while working with the rap pop group Snap!, Ronald "Bee-Stinger" Savage carved the term six elements of the hip hop movement. These six elements are: consciousness awareness, civil rights awareness, activism awareness, justice, political awareness, community awareness.

While working as an artist liaison at Dick Scott Entertainment, he had a mild stroke from the constant stress at his job which ended his career in the music industry. Ronald Savage states about his released single in 2018 "Hip Hop Movement Anthem": "I'm not rapping on the single, this is an arrangement of classic hip hop beats for the clubs and DJ’s to bring fun and peace back to the forefront of hip-hop."

Non-profit and political work 
In 2005, Savage started a non-profit organization called United Coalition Association. Its mission is to fight juvenile delinquency and counteract negative behavior in youth. It also organizes college fairs to prepare students the entrance to college.

Savage also appeared in PSAs encouraging youth to stay away from gang activity, which aired on TV stations such as MTV and VH1. In 2008, Savage was elected to the New York State Democratic Committee with the help of former NYS Assemblyman Peter M Rivera. Savage was honored by the NAACP with an award in recognition of his devotion and commitment and uplifting youth in the community. Ronald Savage is also the founder of the New York State College Fair Day. He also created a DVD called The Plan which provides information about entrance to college.

In 2011 Savage marched with Occupy Wall Street protesters in New York. "We just drew up a resolution to raise taxes on the rich," he said. "I hope it makes it to the floor. The mayor and the governor need to be more egalitarian toward the poor and the working class. This protest and protests from around the world show strength in numbers. It's global. The people are tired," he said.

In 2011, Bronx Borough President Rubén Díaz Jr. did not reappoint Savage, then a New York State Democratic Committeeman for the 76th Assembly District, to local Bronx Community Board 9 in the Soundview area of the Bronx, due to the fact that Savage helped Charlie Ramos (a candidate for senate) in the 2011 September primary elections against Ruben Diaz Jr's father, New York state Sen. Rubén Díaz Sr.

In 2016, Savage accused Afrika Bambaataa of having molested him when Savage was 15 in 1980. Former Hot 97 host Troi Torain aka STAR of the Star & Buc Wild Show in New York City first reported the accusation on the Shot 97 internet radio show, before it was published in the New York Daily News on April 9. The Universal Zulu Nation responded with an open-letter apology to Savage, after three more men came forth with accounts alleging abuse by Bambaataa after Savage's story was published.

Later that year, Savage participated in legislative hearings in Albany organized by Assemblywoman Margaret Markey sponsoring the Child Victims Act, which was drafted to eliminate statute of limitations laws in New York State concerning child molestation allegations and allow a one-year window for alleged victims of past abuse to file a civil lawsuit. Among the people who spoke at the hearings was Queens native Ana Wagner, who was inspired to drive to the hearings and relate her own account after seeing Savage's photo on the front page of the New York Daily News while buying a lottery ticket at a 7-Eleven in Long Island. The bill was passed in 2019.

Savage was featured on the 2016 single "Don't Close Your Eyes" produced by Jonathan Hay, where he spoke over Bambaataa's song "Planet Rock" which was replayed in the track. Savage speaks out about child molestation and issues a very bold challenge to the President of the United States, stating, "Children are being molested every day. I was molested by a world Hip-Hop icon," states Savage. "My question is to the President of the United States of America: what are you going to do about the child molestation crisis of America?”.  Savage also stated in an interview in London, "I don't recognize the term hip hop culture because that is a term Bambaataa coined and I don't know what his intention was when he coined the term, but what I do recognize is hip hop and I salute the rebirth of the hip hop movement".

Discography 

In 2018 – Ron " Bee-Stinger" Savage released the theme song Hip Hop Movement Anthem on Hip Hop Movement Records

In 2019 – Ron "Bee-Stinger" Savage released keep goin on Hip Hop Movement Records

In 2020 – Ron "Bee-Stinger" Savage released Lets go  on Hip Hop Movement Records

In 2021 – Ron "Bee-Stinger" Savage released Stop Cappin  on Hip Hop Movement Records

In 2021 – Ron "Bee- Stinger" Savage released Snacks in the Night  on Hip Hop Movement Records

References 

American hip hop musicians
Political artists
1965 births
Date of birth missing (living people)
Living people
People with epilepsy